National Road 39 is a route belonging to the Polish national roads network. It runs through Łagiewniki in the Lower Silesian Voivodeship into the Opole Voivodeship where it leads to Brzeg and joins the National Road 11 in Kępno in the Greater Poland Voivodeship.

Important settlements along the National Road 39

Łagiewniki
Strzelin
Wiązów
Brzeg
Namysłów
Kamienna
Baranów
Kępno

Route plan

References

39